Callidium brevicorne is a species of beetle in the family Cerambycidae. It was described by Oliver in 1790.

References

Callidium
Beetles described in 1790